Waggarandall is a locality in northern Victoria, Australia in the southern area of the local government area of Shire of Moira.

Waggarandall post office opened on 12 February 1879 and was closed on 31 December 1964.

References

External links

Towns in Victoria (Australia)
Shire of Moira